Guido Valadares National Hospital, formerly Dili National Hospital,  is the national hospital of East Timor. It is located in the eastern part of the capital city of Dili. In 2003 the hospital was renamed after Guido Valadares, who was a government official of the Fretilin government in 1975. As of 2011 it had 260 beds, with secondary and tertiary healthcare services. The hospital treats medical obstetric and surgical patients. On the site of the hospital there is also a major facility for eye diseases. Dialysis is offered within the department of medicine. There is a department of anaesthetics with an intensive care unit

References

Hospitals in East Timor
Buildings and structures in Dili